Caladenia reticulata, commonly known as the veined spider orchid, is a plant in the orchid family Orchidaceae and is endemic to Victoria and South Australia. It is a ground orchid with a single, hairy leaf and usually only one yellowish-green and red flower.

Description
The petals are slightly shorter and narrower than the lateral sepals and taper to narrow, thread-like tips. Flowering occurs from September to November.

Taxonomy and naming
Caladenia reticulata was first formally described in 1882 by Robert D. FitzGerald and the description was published in The Gardeners' Chronicle. The specific epithet (reticulata) is a Latin word meaning "netted" or "net-like".

Distribution and habitat
The veined spider orchid is widespread but localised in Victoria near Stawell, Ararat, Horsham and Dunolly where it usually grows in open woodland. In South Australia it occurs in the Southern Lofty and Kangaroo Island bioregions, growing on forested slopes.

Conservation
Caladenia reticulata is listed as "vulnerable" in Victoria.

References 

reticulata
Plants described in 1882
Endemic orchids of Australia
Orchids of Victoria (Australia)
Orchids of South Australia